Fadil Bellaabouss (born 15 June 1986 in Belfort) is a French track and field athlete who specialises in the 400 metres hurdles.

Achievements

References

External links
 
 

1986 births
Living people
French male hurdlers
Sportspeople from Belfort
20th-century French people
21st-century French people